San Saba High School is a public high school located in the city of San Saba, Texas (USA) and classified as a 2A school by the UIL. It is part of the San Saba Independent School District, which encompasses central San Saba County. In 2015, the school was rated "Met Standard" by the Texas Education Agency.

Athletics
The San Saba Armadillos compete in these sports - 

Baseball
Basketball
Cross Country
Football
Golf
Powerlifting
Softball
Tennis
Track and Field

State Titles
Boys Golf - 
1982(2A), 1983(2A)

References

External links
San Saba Independent School District

Schools in San Saba County, Texas
Public high schools in Texas